Ramsden is a lunar impact crater located on the western stretch of the Palus Epidemiarum. It was named after British instrument maker Jesse Ramsden. To the east-southeast is the crater Capuanus, and to the north lies Dunthorne.

The floor of the crater has been flooded with lava, and contains several small impact craters. The rim is somewhat oval and irregular in outline, with depressions at the north and south walls. It has a slight rampart, but lacks terraces, a central peak, or a ray system.

The crater lies directly across a rille system named the Rimae Ramsden. These span an area 130 kilometers across, sprawling over the western Palus Epidemiarum. A branch reaches northwest to the Mare Nubium, passing between the craters Campanus and Mercator.

Satellite craters
By convention these features are identified on lunar maps by placing the letter on the side of the crater midpoint that is closest to Ramsden.

References

 
 
 
 
 
 
 
 
 
 
 

Impact craters on the Moon